"City Of is the series premiere of the television series Angel.  Written by co-creators Joss Whedon and David Greenwalt and directed by Whedon, it was originally broadcast on October 5, 1999 on the WB network.

Angel (David Boreanaz) was a character in the first three seasons of Buffy the Vampire Slayer. Angel had been a soulless, immortal vampire who was legendary for his evil acts, until a band of wronged Romani punished him in the 19th century by restoring his soul, which overwhelmed him with guilt over his past actions. In the third-season finale, Angel leaves to go to Los Angeles to get away from Buffy, whom he loves but can never be with. In Los Angeles, he meets Doyle (Glenn Quinn), a  half-demon who is sent visions by the Powers That Be about people whom Angel is supposed to rescue from danger. Acting on Doyle's first tip, Angel encounters Cordelia Chase (Charisma Carpenter), who has moved to L.A. from Sunnydale (where Buffy the Vampire Slayer takes place) to pursue a film career. Cordelia convinces Angel that she, Angel and Doyle should start up an agency to help people having supernatural or demonic problems.

Plot
While drowning his sorrows at the bar of a dive in downtown Los Angeles, Angel notices three guys leave the bar with two women. Angel unobtrusively follows them to a dark alley, where he kills the three men, who are revealed to be vampires. One of the frightened girls, Janice, bleeding from a minor head wound, tries to thank him, but Angel, fixated on the blood, warns them harshly to get away from him, and strides down the dark alley.

Angel makes his way to his new home, a basement apartment beneath a ground floor office, where he finds Doyle waiting for him. Doyle introduces himself, explaining he is half human, half demon, then recaps the story of Angel's life, ending with his recent, painful breakup with the Slayer and his subsequent move to L.A. Doyle explains that Angel's isolation, combined with the fact that he recently drank human blood, puts him at serious risk of relapse. Doyle gets visions from The Powers That Be (accompanied by debilitating headaches) regarding people whose lives Angel must touch; true redemption lies not just in saving lives, but in saving souls as well. Doyle concludes by handing over a scrap of paper on which he has jotted information about a young woman named Tina. When Angel asks why Tina needs him, Doyle replies that getting involved in her life enough to figure that out is Angel's first order of business.

Angel finds Tina during her shift and manages to persuade her to meet him after work. Waiting by his car, Angel is surprised to see her in elegant evening dress, and even more surprised when she pulls pepper spray from her purse. Tina accuses Angel of being employed by someone named Russell Winters, but he slowly convinces her to accept his offer of a lift to the "fabulous Hollywood party" she plans to attend. When they arrive, Angel runs into Cordelia Chase, whom he last saw at her graduation ceremony at Sunnydale High some months earlier. After Cordelia brags about how successful she is, she leaves to talk to "people that are somebody", slightly offending him. Angel sees a man harassing Tina and asks about him. She tells him that he is Stacy, a creep, and says that she would like to leave. On their way into the parking garage, Angel fights off Stacy and his goons.

Meanwhile, in her dingy apartment, Cordelia hangs up her one dress and nibbles snacks she stole from the party because she could not afford food, while listening to her talent agent's discouraging phone message. After Tina falls asleep, Angel spends the night on the public library's computers, searching for information about Tina's friend Denise, who disappeared after becoming involved with Russell. The next morning, Angel tells Tina he believes her friend Denise was murdered. As she listens, Tina suddenly spots Doyle's note listing her name and workplace, and, convinced afresh that Angel has been running some scam for Russell, panics and runs. Angel tries to grab her at the building's entrance, but sunlight burns his hand, causing him to turn vampirish reflexively. In stark terror, Tina flees.

Russell Winters, a well-dressed, middle-aged, multi-millionaire businessman, appears and finds Tina when she returns to her apartment to pack. She allows herself to be drawn into his arms; however Russell is actually a vampire and bites her. Angel races to the rescue, only to find Tina dead, marks of vampire predation livid on her throat.

Later that day at his heavily guarded mansion residence, Russell meets with a young lawyer from the evil law firm of Wolfram & Hart to discuss his airtight (fictitious) alibi in the matter of Tina's unfortunate demise. Then, Russell orders the lawyer to bring him Cordelia, whom he has selected as his next victim after seeing her in a video clip image taken during the Hollywood party.

Angel tracks down Stacy and interrogates him until he reveals Russell's location, then persuades a reluctant Doyle to help him avenge Tina's death. Excited by her limo ride to meet the Russell Winters, Cordelia is impressed by his ornate mansion. After a servant ushers her into Russell's den, Cordelia promptly spills the story of her life to her seemingly sympathetic host - until she notices the unusually heavy drapes and lack of mirrors, and concludes aloud that Winters is a vampire. Winters vamps and reaches for Cordelia, who flees. Angel arrives just in time, though, and rescues her, though, Doyle stupidly crashes the convertible into the front gate while trying to help.

The next day, Angel stalks into a top floor conference room at the heavily guarded Russell Winters Enterprises building, where Russell is conducting a meeting with his business associates and the Wolfram & Hart lawyer. Unimpressed by Russell's claim that he can do whatever he wants and get away with it, Angel asks the CEO if he can fly... then forcefully kicks his executive chair through the floor-to-ceiling windows. Exposed to direct sunlight, a screaming Russell bursts into flame and disintegrates to dust in mid-air. The chair, scorched and empty, smashes to the sidewalk below. As Angel calmly departs, the lawyer uses his cell phone to report to his firm that, although the "Senior Partners" need not be disturbed by the news of the death of their client just yet, there seems to be a "new player in town".

Back at home, Angel despondently calls Buffy, but when he hears her voice, hangs up without speaking. Later, Cordelia proposes that they put a sign out front and go into the business of saving souls as a team—at least until her acting career materializes. As Doyle observes many people in L.A. need help, Angel stands alone atop a skyscraper, looking out over the bustling L.A. nightscape.

Production
The vampire prosthetics were a newly created prototype design for this episode, as the production team wanted to try a darker, scarier look. However, they were unhappy with the effect, and soon returned to Buffy-style vamp-faces.

Writing
In the original script, the scene in which Angel finds Tina's dead body ends with him cradling her, then licking her blood from his fingers. Although creator Joss Whedon claims that moment was the point of the episode, as it shows how Angel is struggling in his goal of redemption, it was ultimately cut. "It was dark enough that he didn’t save this girl," says supervising producer Tim Minear. "I don’t think you needed him licking her dead body." A similar scene occurs in flashback in Season Four, where Angelus reveals this caused Angel to revert to the pathetic state he is in when Whistler encounters him eating rats in 1996.

Music
In his essay on music as narrative agent, Matthew Mills points out how the theme used for the character of Angel is used multiple times in this episode, at different tempos and by different instruments. When Doyle first offers Angel a chance of redemption, his theme starts but does not end; its "incompleteness mirroring Angel's inability to answer Doyle's question". When Angel finally accepts Doyle's challenge at the end of the episode, his theme plays with a "brief respite from minor tonality" to underscore his newfound determination.

Novelization 
The episode has been novelized by Nancy Holder. The novel City of was published in 1999 and translated into French (La Cité des Anges), German (Stadt der Träume) and Brazilian Portuguese (Bem-Vindo a Los Angeles). 
 Nancy Holder: Angel: City of. Simon Spotlight Entertainment

Reception

Salon.com cautiously praised Angel for merging the two genres - film noir and the superhero graphic-novel - that best showcase Angel's "wounded, night-crawling loner mystique", but worried that Angel's new mission was overly sentimental: "Is the show going to turn into Touched by Angel?"

References

External links

 

Angel (season 1) episodes
American television series premieres
1999 American television episodes
Buffyverse crossover episodes
Television episodes written by Joss Whedon
Television episodes directed by Joss Whedon
Television episodes written by David Greenwalt